Charleroi Historic District is a historic district in Charleroi, Washington County, Pennsylvania.

It consists of almost 1700 buildings, built mainly from 1890 to 1920.  Many of the buildings are wooden frame two-story front gabled residences, but others include brick stores, churches, union halls, and clubs.  The district is located on a plain along the Monongahela River and the adjoining hills.

References

Further reading
[ Charleroi Historic District National Register Inventory]
The first Masonic Lodge of the American Federation of the Droit Humain was created in Charleroi by Louis GOAZIOU (French) in 1903.Its name was Alfa Lodge N°301. This Obedience did allow women to be initiale and become a member with the same rights as men. (Co-Masonry)
Source: le Droit Humain International- Marc Grosjean (Detrad)

External links

Historic districts in Washington County, Pennsylvania
Houses on the National Register of Historic Places in Pennsylvania
Victorian architecture in Pennsylvania
Houses in Washington County, Pennsylvania
Historic districts on the National Register of Historic Places in Pennsylvania
National Register of Historic Places in Washington County, Pennsylvania